West Moreton was the name of two incarnations of an electoral district of the Legislative Assembly in the Australian state of Queensland.

History
The original district, named for the region it covered, took in all of the Brisbane River catchment area as well as Ipswich and Laidley, bordering New South Wales to the south. It elected three members from 1860 to 1873 and one member from 1873 until its abolition in 1878.

The district was re-created in 1932 to take in an area west of Brisbane. It was abolished in 1949.

Elections

1860–63
In the inaugural 1860 election, there were five candidates for the three-member electoral district of West Moreton: George Thorn (senior), Alfred Broughton, Pollett Cardew, J. Kent, and the Rev. Dr. William Nelson. On election day 3 May 1860, Thorn, Broughton and Nelson were elected. However, Mr Chubb on behalf of the unsuccessful Mr Cardew protested against the election of the Reverend Nelson as he was a priest in holy orders and was therefore disqualified from being elected. The Rev. Nelson then announced that he had resigned his religious role. On 22 June 1860, the Committee on Elections ruled that the Rev. Nelson was disqualified and a new election must be called to replace him. Joseph Fleming won the resulting by-election on 9 July 1860.

Fleming held the seat until he resigned on 3 November 1862 when he became bankrupt. Joshua Peter Bell won the resulting by-election on 15 December 1862.

Members for West Moreton

Notable members
The district seated two Premiers: Robert Herbert and George Thorn, Jr.

See also
 Electoral districts of Queensland
 Members of the Queensland Legislative Assembly by year
 :Category:Members of the Queensland Legislative Assembly by name

References

Former electoral districts of Queensland
1860 establishments in Australia